East Avenue is a major street located within the Diliman area of Quezon City, Philippines. It runs north–south through the eastern edge of Triangle Park. The street is located in Quezon City's government area, known for different national and local government institutions, offices, and hospitals. It is also home to the Quezon City Hall Complex located on the avenue's junction with Elliptical Road. The entire avenue is designated as National Route 174 (N174) of the Philippine highway network.

Route description
East Avenue is a six-lane road located at the heart of Quezon City's government district. It begins at its junction with EDSA east of Timog Avenue by the border of barangay Pinyahan in central Diliman. It heads north from this junction to cross Magalang Street, NIA Road, V. Luna Avenue, Matapang Street, BIR Road, Matalino, Makatarungan Street, and Mayaman Street towards the Quezon Memorial Circle. Located on or near this southern section of East are the Kamuning MRT Station, LTO Central Office, LTFRB Central Office, DPWH Region IV-A Offices, National Intelligence Coordinating Agency Office, Land Registration Authority Office, Philippine Statistics Authority main office, and the Social Security System Main Office. After crossing the BIR Road, the western section is dominated by more government establishments particularly medical institutions, including East Avenue Medical Center, Bangko Sentral ng Pilipinas Security Plant Complex, Philippine Heart Center, Laguna Lake Development Authority headquarters, National Kidney and Transplant Institute, and the Quezon City Hall Complex. The avenue terminates at the intersection with Elliptical Road.

History
Previously called as Silangan Avenue (Tagalog for east), the avenue forms the western boundary of the formerly proposed  Diliman Quadrangle within the former Diliman Estate, also known as Hacienda de Tuason, purchased by the Philippine Commonwealth government in 1939 as the new capital to replace Manila. It was originally planned as the new city's Central Park housing the new national government buildings (the new presidential palace, Capitol Building, and Supreme Court complex) within the  elliptical site now known as the Quezon Memorial Circle. The quadrangle is bordered on the north by North Avenue, on the east by East Avenue, on the south by Timog (South) Avenue, and on the west by West Avenue. Designed by American city planner William E. Parsons and Harry Frost, in collaboration with engineer AD Williams and architects Juan Arellano and Louis Croft, the site was also to contain the  national exposition grounds opposite the corner of North Avenue and EDSA (now occupied by SM City North EDSA). The Diliman Quadrangle had been largely undeveloped for decades due to lack of funding. After several revisions, the government planners moved the city center to Novaliches due to its higher elevation. By 1976, the country's capital had been transferred back to Manila with only the Quezon Memorial built in the former capital site. In 1984, the avenue, alongside Timog Avenue, was renamed to President Carlos P. Garcia Avenue, after the former president.

Intersections

References

Streets in Quezon City